Pol Llonch Puyaltó (born 7 October 1992) is a Spanish professional footballer who plays for Dutch club Willem II as a midfielder.

Club career
Born in Barcelona, Catalonia, Llonch finished his youth career with CE L'Hospitalet after starting out at CE Europa. He made his senior debut with the former club in the 2011–12 season, in the Segunda División B.

Llonch moved to RCD Espanyol on 30 June 2014, being assigned to the reserves also in the third tier. He also trained with the first team in February, mainly to cover for injuries of José Cañas and Abraham.

On 3 August 2015, Llonch signed a two-year deal with Segunda División side Girona FC. He made his professional debut on 9 September, starting in a 2–2 away draw against Gimnàstic de Tarragona in the second round of the Copa del Rey (5–4 loss on penalties). His maiden league appearance took place ten days later, in a 2–1 win at Real Oviedo where he came on as a late substitute.

Llonch was loaned to Club Recreativo Granada of the third division on 11 July 2016, for one year. The following 31 January, he terminated his contract with Girona and immediately joined Wisła Kraków.

After one season in the Ekstraklasa, Llonch moved countries again, signing a three-year deal at Willem II in the Netherlands. He scored his first professional goal on 20 January 2019 to open a 2–0 home victory in the Eredivisie over North Brabant rivals NAC Breda, and played six games in a run to the final of the KNVB Cup which was lost 4–0 to AFC Ajax. 

In September 2020, Llonch extended his contract until 2024. A year later – despite not being fluent in the national language – he was made captain when veteran Jordens Peters retired through injury.

Career statistics

References

External links

1992 births
Living people
Spanish footballers
Footballers from Barcelona
Association football midfielders
Segunda División players
Segunda División B players
CE L'Hospitalet players
RCD Espanyol B footballers
Girona FC players
Club Recreativo Granada players
Ekstraklasa players
Wisła Kraków players
Eredivisie players
Eerste Divisie players
Willem II (football club) players
Spanish expatriate footballers
Expatriate footballers in Poland
Expatriate footballers in the Netherlands
Spanish expatriate sportspeople in Poland
Spanish expatriate sportspeople in the Netherlands